ESPN College Football is the branding used for broadcasts of NCAA Division I FBS college football across ESPN properties, including ESPN, ESPN2, ESPN3, ESPN+,  ABC, ESPN Classic, ESPNU, ESPN Deportes, ESPNews and ESPN Radio. ESPN College Football debuted in 1982.

ESPN College Football consists of four to five games a week, with ESPN College Football Primetime, which airs at 7:30 on Thursdays. Saturday includes ESPN College Football Noon at 12:00 Saturday, a 3:30 or 4:30 game that is not shown on a weekly basis, and ESPN College Football Primetime on Saturday. A Sunday game, Sunday Showdown, was added for the first half of 2006 to make up for the loss of Sunday Night Football to NBC.

ESPN also produces ESPN College Football on ABC and ESPN Saturday Night Football on ABC in separate broadcast packages.

The American, ACC, Big Ten, Big 12, Conference USA, MAC, Pac-12, SEC, and Sun Belt are all covered by ESPN along with FBS Independents BYU and Liberty. Through its online arm ESPN3 and the ESPN+ streaming service, ESPN carries a wide variety of other athletic conferences and games at lower divisions, spanning the full breadth of college football.

History
ESPN began airing taped college football games during the 1979 regular season, starting with a game between Colorado and Oregon.  The network was limited to airing tape-delayed games because the NCAA controlled television rights through exclusive contracts.  However, because bowl games operate outside the control of the NCAA, ESPN was able to air the 1982 Independence Bowl between Kansas State and Wisconsin live (through a simulcast with the Mizlou Television Network) – the first live football game televised on ESPN.

After the 1984 Supreme Court decision in NCAA v. Board of Regents of the University of Oklahoma allowed individual schools to negotiate television rights, ESPN began broadcasting live regular-season games during the 1984 season, beginning with a game between BYU and Pittsburgh on September 1, 1984. The first live broadcast of a regular-season night game followed that night, between the Florida Gators, who were ranked number 17, and the Miami Hurricanes, who were ranked number 10.

In recent years, ESPN and ESPN2 air games at noon, which usually includes a Big Ten game. Both networks also air primetime games, typically featuring teams from the ACC or SEC.

With the expansion of ESPN, including multiple networks and outlets, their coverage has likewise increased. In 2005, with the creation of ESPNU, over 300 games were aired on its networks.

In 2007, the ESPN family of networks aired over 450 games. Also, they aired a weekly game on ESPN Radio for the first time ever. ESPN started that season with 25 hours of college football programming.

Also, ESPNU has rapidly increased the coverage of spring intramural team scrimmages with entire programs dedicated to this phenomenon. In 2008, ESPN aired College GameDay from Florida Field prior to their spring scrimmage game.

Starting with the 2007 season, ESPN began sublicensing games from Fox Sports Net, with the Big 12 Conference (later extended until 2009) and with the Pacific-10 Conference. However, the games cannot air during the “reverse mirror” slot.

During the 2008 season, ESPN aired over 400 games.

Beginning in the 2010 season, ESPN acquired exclusive broadcast rights to the Bowl Championship Series in a four-year contract, where all games in the BCS would be aired on ESPN.

Also in 2010, the company launched ESPN Goal Line, a gametime-only channel that switches between games to show the most interesting plays, similar to NFL RedZone.

In 2012, ESPN reached long-term, 12-year agreements to retain rights to the Rose Bowl, Orange Bowl, and Sugar Bowl following the dissolution of the Bowl Championship Series. In November, ESPN reached a 12-year deal to broadcast the remainder of the new College Football Playoff system, valued at around $470 million per-year, giving it continued rights to the Peach Bowl and Fiesta Bowl, as well as the Cotton Bowl Classic and the College Football Playoff National Championship. 

For the 2014-15 postseason, ESPN implemented a major overhaul of its on-air presentation with flat design and a score box in the bottom-right of the screen, which soft launched during the New Orleans Bowl, and formally debuted alongside new imaging for the first CFP bowl games.  ESPN revamped its on-air presentation for college football again for the 2020 season, with a "test facility" theme, and a scoreboard along the bottom of the screen reminiscent of Monday Night Football.

In 2017, ESPN renewed its rights to the Big Ten; the network lost its tier 1 rights to Big Ten football to Fox Sports, meaning that it no longer has the first choices of games each week.

In 2019, ESPN began a 12-year deal with the American Athletic Conference, with at least 40 football games on ESPN linear networks and ABC per-season, and all other content on ESPN+. ESPN+ also acquired the third-tier media rights to most Big 12 teams, besides the Texas Longhorns (who have a partnership with ESPN on Longhorn Network) and Oklahoma Sooners (which had a partnership with Fox Sports Oklahoma). ESPN+ eventually acquired the Sooners' rights in 2022, in an agreement that will last through its exit to the SEC in 2025.

In December 2020, ESPN announced a 10-year, $3 billion contract to hold the top media rights for the SEC beginning in 2024, ending its long-standing agreement with CBS, and seeing its flagship package of games move to ABC.

In August 2022, it was reported that ESPN had backed out of negotiations to renew its rights to Big Ten athletics after the 2022 season, ending a relationship dating back to the 1980s. The Big Ten ultimately signed with Fox, CBS (where its Big Ten package will effectively replace its SEC package in 2024), and NBC, with all three networks holding shares of its college football and basketball rights.

Programs
College Football Live - Daily program during the season and weekly show in the offseason
College GameDay - Weekly show (in-season) from the site of the biggest game of the day or significance
College Football Final - Saturday show reviewing the highlights of the days and the biggest stories

ESPNU programs
ESPNU Inside The Polls
ESPNU Coaches Spotlight
ESPNU Recruiting Insider

Former programs
Thursday GameNight (formerly the Weekend Kickoff Show)

Coverage

ESPN airs Spring Football games and coverage. Coverage includes College Football Final which wraps the annual Spring Games.

During the regular season, ESPN airs pre-selected Thursday night marquee matchups. ESPN2 airs pre-selected Friday night contests from lesser known Division I schools. In late October and November, games almost exclusively from the Mid-American Conference air on Tuesdays or Wednesdays, usually on ESPN2.

The weekend games with the exception of the regular season are typically selected a week or two weeks out. ABC gets the first pick of games for all the major conferences, with the exception of the SEC, in which case CBS get their first selection.

ESPN/ESPN2 formerly aired coverage of ABC games in a "reverse mirror" format. Both networks will also air other selected midweek games and Sunday games, typically teams from more “minor” conferences (Sunday games are exceptionally rare because of conflicts with ESPN Sunday Night Baseball and the network's professional football coverage, both NFL and Canadian football).

ESPN Radio airs a weekly game as well as selected College Football Playoff bowl games including all bowl and national championship games.

ESPNU usually airs 5 games per week.

Before its closure in December 2021, ESPN Classic aired selected games throughout the year.

Typical games
ESPN's Saturdays during the regular season begin at 9:00 AM ET with College GameDay, a three-hour live show that previews the day's games.  This counts down to the first set of games for the day, which begin at noon ET on ABC, ESPN, and ESPN2.  Another set of games will begin across those three networks around 3:30 PM.  At the conclusion of the second game, Saturday Night Football on ABC games are presented each Saturday evening starting at 7:30 p.m. during the college football regular season, which has been the case since 2017. ESPN College Football Saturday Primetime starts around 7:00, as does another game on ESPN2.  Late-night games (often from the Pac-12 Conference) begin on ESPN and ESPN2 around 10:30 ET, in prime time on the west coast. 

Kickoff Week is the first weekend of the college football weekend. Games include the Advocare Classic, the Chick-fil-A Kickoff Game and other non-conference action.  One game will air on ABC on Sunday night, and second game will air on ESPN on the following Monday night.  After the first week of the college football season, the NFL season begins, and so these windows are filled with NBC's Sunday Night Football and ESPN's Monday Night Football, respectively.

Championship Weekend always features the MAC Championship Game and will feature the Pac-12 Championship game every other year beginning in 2013. Previously it has featured the WAC Championship Game, the C-USA Championship Game, and the Big 12 Championship game before they changed affiliates or dropped below the minimum 12 teams required for a football championship.

The ESPN family of networks air the Division I FCS conference playoffs as well as the Division II and III championship games.

ESPN and ESPN2 air the bulk of the games during ‘‘Bowl Week’’ (which contrary to its name extends to well over two calendar weeks because of the huge number of bowls, many created by ESPN's own event division, the networks air).

Through the network's online arms WatchESPN and ESPN3, the ESPN networks cover the breadth of almost all levels of college football.

Nielsen ratings

Conference Championship Games since 2015

2021-22 Bowl Games

Non-game action

College GameDay
ESPN airs the nationally renowned College GameDay. Since 1993 and almost exclusively in recent years, it has aired from the top game of the week or one of significance. For the 2010 season, the show was expanded to three hours, with the first hour airing on ESPNU.

Home Depot College Football Awards
Since 1990, ESPN has aired the show live from the Boardwalk in Orlando, Florida. The show airs several awards.

Heisman Trophy Presentation
Since 1994, ESPN has aired the Heisman Trophy from New York City. It is typically an hour-long program featuring interviews with past winners and nominees (with their families or coaches).

Personalities

See also
ESPN College Football Primetime
ESPN College Football Thursday Primetime
ESPN College Football Friday Primetime
ESPN College Football Saturday Primetime
ESPN2 College Football Saturday Primetime
ESPNU College Football
ESPN College Football on ABC
Saturday Night Football
ESPN Plus

References

External links
 
 

College Football
College Football
ABC Sports
American Broadcasting Company original programming
1982 American television series debuts
1990s American television series
2000s American television series
2010s American television series
2020s American television series
Sports telecast series
ESPN